The title Marquis of Torres Novas (in Portuguese Marquês de Torres Novas) was created by royal decree, dated from 27 March 1520, by King Manuel I of Portugal, to Dom John of Lencastre (1501–1571), eldest son of Infante George, Duke of Coimbra.

In 1535 the new King, John III, granted him the new title of Duke of Aveiro and, from then on, the title of Marquis of Torres Novas was allocated to the Duke of Aveiro's heir.

List of the Marquesses of Torres Novas
 John of Lencastre (1501–1571), son of Infante George, Duke of Coimbra (therefore grandson of King John II of Portugal). Later he became the 1st Duke of Aveiro;
 George of Lencastre (1548–1578), his son, became 2nd Duke of Aveiro; 
 George of Lencastre (1594–1634), his grandson, became 1st Duke of Torres Novas;
 Raimundo of Lencastre (1620–1666), his son, became 2nd Duke of Torres Novas and 4th Duke of Aveiro;
 Peter of Lencastre, 5th Duke of Aveiro (1608–1673), also Archbishop of Évora, died without issue;
 Gabriel of Lencastre, 7th Duke of Aveiro (1667–1745), died without issue.

Genealogical summary

See also
 Duke of Aveiro
 Duke of Torres Novas
 List of Marquesses in Portugal

External links
 The Marquesses of Torres Novas – Portuguese Genealogical site

Bibliography
"Nobreza de Portugal e do Brasil" – Vol. III, pages 446/447. Published by Zairol Lda., Lisbon 1989.

Portuguese nobility
Marquis
Noble titles created in 1520